Subalaya High School is a government high school located at Subalaya in the Birmaharajpur subdivision, Odisha, India.

See also

 Education in Odisha
 List of schools in Odisha

References

Education in Subarnapur district
High schools and secondary schools in Odisha
Educational institutions in India with year of establishment missing